Archana is an Indian actress who has worked in Kannada, Telugu, Tamil and Hindi films.  She is known for her performances in such movies including Ee Hrudaya Ninagagi (1996), A (1998), Phool Aur Aag (1999) and Yajamana (2000).

Career
Archana was born into a Marathi speaking family. She made her debut in the 1996 Kannada movie Aadithya opposite Shiva Rajkumar. She went on to appear in many movies including Phool Aur Aag in 1999 in which she was paired with Mithun Chakraborty. In her career as an actress, Archana has acted in more than 40 films.

Selected filmography 
Movies of Archana include:

References 

Actresses in Kannada cinema
Actresses in Hindi cinema
Actresses in Tamil cinema
Actresses in Telugu cinema
21st-century Indian actresses
People from Karnataka
Living people
Year of birth missing (living people)